The 2015 Colorado Ice season was the team's ninth season as a professional indoor football franchise and seventh in the Indoor Football League (IFL). One of ten teams that competed in the IFL for the 2015 season, the Fort Collins-based Colorado Ice were members of the Intense Conference.

Founded in 2007 as part of United Indoor Football, the Colorado Ice became charter members of the IFL when the UIF merged with the Intense Football League before the 2009 season. In their third season under head coach Heron O'Neal, the team played their home games at the Budweiser Events Center in Loveland, Colorado.

The Colorado Icicles dance team was led by director Rehannon Crumb.

Schedule
Key:

Regular season
All start times are local time

Standings

Roster

References

External links
Colorado Ice official statistics
Colorado Ice at Loveland Reporter-Herald
Colorado Ice at Fort Collins Coloradoan

Colorado Ice
Colorado Crush (IFL)
Colorado Ice